In Christianity, ministry is an activity carried out by Christians to express or spread their faith, the prototype being the Great Commission. The Encyclopedia of Christianity defines it as "carrying forth Christ's mission in the world", indicating that it is "conferred on each Christian in baptism." It is performed by most Christians. This is distinguished from the "office of minister", to which specific individuals who feel a certain vocation. It can signify this activity as a whole, or specific activities, or organizations within a church dedicated to specific activities. Some ministries are identified formally as such, and some are not; some ministry is directed towards members of the church, and some towards non-members. See also Apostolates.

Age-specific ministry
As churches attempt to meet the needs of their congregations, they often separate their members into groups according to age categories. Age-specific groups meet for religious study including Sunday school programs, fellowship, and other activities. These age divisions may include:
Nursery
Pre-school
Children, generally elementary age students
Youth, generally middle and high school students
Young Adults, designed for university-age students
Adults, which is often broken up into single adults, couples ministry, men's and women's ministries, and senior adults.

Advantages and disadvantages
There are several advantages to the concept of age-specific ministries.
Many parents / caregivers are glad to allow the church to be in charge of the spiritual enrichment of their children. Similarly, they are used to using programs for the development of their children such as weekday childcare, preschool, and grade school and enjoy the ability to continue a similar format in church.
These ministries allow churches to provide 'age-appropriate' activities and content to maximize spiritual education and growth as well as peer group fellowship.
Ministries often provide fellowship activities outside of the church service that encourage the involvement of non-church going friends and relatives.

Age-specific ministry does have certain disadvantages, mostly stemming from the separation of children from the primary church functions.
In terms of religious education, the 'socialization' of children into the faith community is one important approach that requires connecting the children and family with the wider congregation.
These ministries may increase the possibility of child abuse within the church as it does increase the amount of time children spend without the supervision of their particular parent or caretaker or the presence of the congregation at large. It is worth noting, however, that many churches hire certified teachers to fill these positions and most perform background checks on anyone that may come into supervisory contact with children.
Certain forms of these ministries reduce the role that "family life" plays in the development of children, because of the separation of differing age groups into differently facilitated programs. In some ministries, the children are also placed separate from the rest of the congregation, such as during Sunday school and youth programs. Many of these programs, however, take place at different times from the primary church service, and in many churches, only children of elementary school age and younger are separated from the main service to provide more relevant material to their age group.

Creative and performing arts
Nearly all churches feature some form of worship music, whether from a choir, orchestra, or worship band, whether accompanied or a cappella. Religious organizations also incorporate other forms of creative and performance arts into their services or programs.

Community service and outreach
Many churches sponsor ministries designed to reach out others on a local and global scale, usually grouped under the heading of missions. There are many organizations which perform missions on a fully funded and organized level, such as the North American Mission Board, operated by the Southern Baptist Convention and the Unitarian Universalist Service Committee (UUSC).

However, some Christian churches and ministries have evolved to take on a larger role in the community service and global outreach programs. Community service ministries may include a "soup kitchen", homeless ministry, crisis center, food pantry, unplanned pregnancy center, senior visitation program, new parent support, Animal Chaplains, or a number of other specialized ministries.  These specialized ministries can include formal or informal approaches to intentionally interacting with others, encouraging, counseling, and providing relational care to them.

If activities such as these are held at a church but are not organized primarily by its members and do not contain religious overtones, the activity would better be classified as church reordering, rather than ministry.

Sacramental ministry, Catholic Church
Theologians differentiate between Religious ministry and Apostolates. Ministry, for Catholics, pertains to the administration of the Sacraments, and their appropriate ministers are as follows:

A final, and most proper, use of the term "ministries" pertains to those instituted by the bishop:

Acolyte (May administer the Eucharist)
Lector (May read the readings at Mass, except for the Gospel which is reserve for a priest or deacon)

Ordained ministers are those who have received Holy Orders: deacons, priests, and bishops. Note that a bishop can do anything a priest can do, and a priest can do anything a deacon can do.

Christianity
Christian theology
Theology of relational care
Minister of religion
Sermon
Ministry of Jesus
Great Commission
Homeless ministry
Parachurch organization

References

Christian terminology